Ernst Karl Mohr (30 September 1877 – 18 February 1916) was a German gymnast. He competed in three events at the 1904 Summer Olympics. He died in a Russian prisoner of war camp during World War I.

References

External links
 

1877 births
1916 deaths
German male artistic gymnasts
Olympic gymnasts of Germany
Athletes (track and field) at the 1904 Summer Olympics
Gymnasts at the 1904 Summer Olympics
Gymnasts from Berlin
German military personnel killed in World War I
German prisoners of war in World War I
World War I prisoners of war held by Russia